The Steeple is a rocky ridge, about 500 m, forming the northwest arm of horseshoe-shaped Mount Carroll. It rises on the east side of Depot Glacier, 1.5 nautical miles (2.8 km) south of the head of Hope Bay, at the northeast end of Antarctic Peninsula. Discovered by the Swedish Antarctic Expedition, 1901–04, under Otto Nordenskjöld. The descriptive name was applied by the Falkland Islands Dependencies Survey (FIDS), 1945.

Ridges of Graham Land
Landforms of Trinity Peninsula